Daniel Preston is the name of:

Dan Preston (born 1991), English footballer
Danny Preston (born 2000), English footballer